The Lake Pedder planarian (Romankenkius pedderensis) is a species of invertebrate in the family Dugesiidae.

Distribution and conservation status 

The species is endemic to the Lake Pedder area in Tasmania, Australia. This species has been considered extinct by the IUCN Red List of Threatened Species since 1986, although their last conservation assessment was dated 1996. Live specimens of this species were collected in 2006 and the ongoing existence of the species was again confirmed in 2012.

See also

References

Dugesiidae
Animals described in 1974
Lake Pedder
Taxonomy articles created by Polbot